Juan Adrián Ríos Amaya (born 30 January 1997) is a Mexican footballer who plays as a forward for UAT.

References

1997 births
Living people
Association football forwards
Correcaminos UAT footballers
Ascenso MX players
Liga Premier de México players
Tercera División de México players
Footballers from Sonora
Sportspeople from Hermosillo
21st-century Mexican people
Mexican footballers